Naarda flavisignata is a species of moth in the family Noctuidae first described by Vári in 1962.

References

Herminiinae
Moths described in 1962